The Mayor of Tainan is the head of the Tainan City Government, Taiwan and is elected to a four-year term. The current mayor is Huang Wei-cher of the Democratic Progressive Party since 25 December 2018.

Titles of the Mayor

List of Mayors 
This list includes only those persons who served as mayors of Tainan City after the end of World War II, during the Post-War era of Taiwan. The first two mayors served were appointed by the central government of the Republic of China (Taiwan).

The numerals indicate the consecutive time in office served by a single elected mayor. For example, Su Nan-cheng served two consecutive terms and is counted as the tenth mayor (not the eighth and ninth). Yeh Ting-kuei served three non-consecutive terms and is counted chronologically as the 3rd, the 5th, and the 7th mayor. Because of this, the list below contains 14 mayoralties, but only 12 people.

Mayor of Tainan (Provincial city)

Appointed mayors

Elected mayors

Mayor of Tainan (Special municipality)

Timeline

See also
 Tainan City Government
 Tainan City Council
 Tainan City

References

External links

 Tainan City Government

Tainan
 
Government of Tainan